Our Lady and St Cuthbert Church is a Roman Catholic parish church in Berwick-upon-Tweed, Northumberland, England. It was built in 1829 in the Gothic Revival style, intentionally hidden away from the street. It is located on Ravensdowne to the south of Berwick Barracks in the centre of the town. It is a Grade II listed building.

History

Foundation
During the Reformation the Catholics in Berwick and the surrounding area were served by Jesuit priests who were based in Berrington and Haggerston. In 1799, two French Catholic priests, escaping the French Revolution, were resident in Berwick in a property bought for them by the Sir John Haggerston. They celebrated Mass in a chapel next to the house. In 1810, they were replaced by Benedictine priests.

Construction
The Benedictine priests, with the Haggerston Baronets, bought the site of the current church. It was built to have a capacity of 300 people. On 25 June 1829, it opened. The old priest house became a school. In 1852, the church was given a painting of the Agony in the Garden by a local man, James Grieve, who was originally given the painting by King Charles X of France. In the 1880s, the church was extended, doubling in size. The current chancel and north window were built. The school building was replaced by St Cuthbert's School, which later moved and the building became the parish centre.

Parish
At some point the Benedictine priests left the parish and were replaced by priests from the Diocese of Hexham and Newcastle. The church is currently served by a Carmelite, Fr Paul Jenkins. The parish is partnered with St Aidan's Church in Seahouses and St Aidan's Church on Lindisfarne. Our Lady and St Cuthbert's Church has two Sunday Masses at 6:00pm on Saturday and 9:30am on Sunday.

Exterior

See also
 
 Diocese of Hexham and Newcastle

References

External links
 

Berwick-upon-Tweed
Grade II listed churches in Northumberland
Roman Catholic churches completed in 1829
Roman Catholic churches in Northumberland
Grade II listed Roman Catholic churches in England
Gothic Revival church buildings in England
1829 establishments in England
19th-century Roman Catholic church buildings in the United Kingdom